Mathias Sandorf is a 1963 historical adventure film directed by Georges Lampin and starring Louis Jourdan, Renaud Mary and Francisco Rabal. Made as a co-production between France, Italy and Spain it is based on the 1885 novel of the same title by Jules Verne.

The film's sets were designed by the art director Maurice Colasson. It was shot at studios in Barcelona and the Billancourt Studios in Paris.

Cast
 Louis Jourdan as Le comte Mathias Sandorf
 Renaud Mary as Sarcany
 Francisco Rabal as Frédéric de Rotenbourg
 Serena Vergano as Elisabeth Sandorf
 Antoine Balpêtré as Professor Ernst Bathory
 Bernard Blier as Toronthal
 Valeria Fabrizi as Helene
 Antonio Casas as Zathmar
 Xan das Bolas as Carpena
 Carlos Mendy as Ferrato
 Daniel Cauchy as Pescade
 Carl Studer as Matifou
 Claudio Gora as Procureur

References

Bibliography
 Dayna Oscherwitz & MaryEllen Higgins. The A to Z of French Cinema. Scarecrow Press, 2009.

External links

Mathias Sandorf at Variety Distribution

1963 films
1960s French-language films
1960s historical adventure films
Films shot at Billancourt Studios
Films directed by Georges Lampin
Films based on Mathias Sandorf
French historical adventure films
Italian historical adventure films
Spanish historical adventure films
1960s French films
1960s Italian films